Acianthera caparaoensis is a species of orchid endemic to Brazil. It was first formally named Pleurothallis caparoensis in 1943 and transferred to the genus Acianthera in 2001.

References

caparaoensis
Orchids of Minas Gerais
Taxa named by Mark Wayne Chase